Buy Our Intention; We'll Buy You a Unicorn is the second full-length album released by Kaddisfly. It is also the title of the album's thirteenth track.

Track listing
Christopher James Ruff

"La Primera Natural Disaster"  – 3:16
"A Message to the Flat Earth Society"  – 3:39
"The Calm of Calamity"  – 4:58
"Crimson Solitude"  – 4:35
"Eres Tremulent"  – 4:52
"New Moon Over Swift Water"  – 3:21
"Let Weight Be Measured by Merit"  – 3:02
"Akira."  – 2:22
"For the Ejection of Rest; They'll Dance"  – 3:30
"Osmosis in C"  – 4:18
"What Comes of Honesty"  – 2:12
"Five Tears from a Carpenter's Eye for Detail"  – 6:04
"Buy Our Intention; We'll Buy You a Unicorn"  – 5:45
"Set Sail the Prairie"  – 5:13
"Horses Galloping on Sail Boats"  – 10:25

Personnel 
Aaron William Tollefson - Guitar, Mandolin
Christopher James Ruff - Vocals, Lyrics, Piano, Art Layout
Kile Michael Brewer - Bass
Beau Justin Kuther - Drums, Percussion
Kelsey Beck Kuther - Guitar, Slide, Percussion
Ryan Case - Artwork
Enoch Jensen - Production, Engineering
Alan Douches - Mastering

2005 albums
Hopeless Records albums